Baha (also transliterated as Bahaa) may refer to:

People
 Baha (name)

Places
Al Bahah, a city in Saudi Arabia

Trademark
Cochlear Baha, a hearing aid manufactured by Cochlear

Title
Al-Muqtana Baha'uddin (979–1043), Druze religious leader
Bahá'u'lláh (1817–1892), religious leader of a world religion from Iran

See also
Baháʼí Faith, a religion
BAHA (disambiguation)
Baja (disambiguation)

Arabic-language surnames
Arabic masculine given names
Turkish masculine given names